The  Asian Baseball Championship was the first continental tournament held by the Baseball Federation of Asia, from 18 to 26 December. The tournament was held in Manila, Philippines, and was won by the host nation. 17,000 people attended the final game at Rizal Stadium to see Philippines defeat Japan 8–1. As of 2019, it is the only time that the Philippines have won the tournament. South Korea (3rd) and Taiwan (4th) were the other participants.

References

Bibliography 
 

Asian Baseball Championship
International baseball competitions hosted by the Philippines
1954 in Philippine sport
Asian Baseball Championship
Sports competitions in Manila
20th century in Manila